Yun Gi-su (born June 19, 1967) is a South Korean sprint canoer who competed in the late 1980s. At the 1988 Summer Olympics in Seoul, he was eliminated in the repechages of the K-2 500 m event.

External links

1967 births
Canoeists at the 1988 Summer Olympics
Living people
Olympic canoeists of South Korea
South Korean male canoeists
Korea National Sport University alumni